Arthur is a 1981 American romantic comedy film written and directed by Steve Gordon. It stars Dudley Moore as Arthur Bach, a drunken New York City millionaire who is on the brink of an arranged marriage to a wealthy heiress but ends up falling for a common working-class girl from Queens. It was the sole film directed by Gordon, who died in 1982 of a heart attack at age 44.

The film earned over $95 million domestically, making it the fourth-highest-grossing film of 1981. Its title song, "Arthur's Theme (Best That You Can Do)", won the Academy Award for Best Original Song. Co-written by Christopher Cross, Burt Bacharach, Carole Bayer Sager, and Peter Allen, it was performed by Christopher Cross. Sir John Gielgud also won the Academy Award for Best Supporting Actor. It was nominated for two other Academy Awards for Best Actor for Moore and Best Original Screenplay for Gordon.

Plot 

Arthur Bach is a spoiled alcoholic from New York City, who likes to be driven in his chauffeured Rolls-Royce Silver Wraith limousine through Central Park. Arthur is heir to a portion of his family's vast fortune, but only if he marries the upper-class Susan Johnson, the daughter of a business acquaintance of his father. He does not love Susan, but his family feels that she will make him finally grow up. During a shopping trip in Manhattan, accompanied by his valet, Hobson, Arthur witnesses a young woman, Linda Marolla, shoplifting a necktie. He intercedes with the store security guard on her behalf, and later asks her for a date. Despite his attraction to her, Arthur remains pressured by his family to marry Susan.

While visiting his grandmother, Martha, Arthur shares his feelings for Linda, but is warned again that he will be disowned if he does not marry Susan. Hobson, who has been more like a father to him than Arthur's real father, realizes that Arthur is beginning to grow up, and secretly encourages Linda to attend Arthur's engagement party. Hobson confides in Linda that he senses Arthur loves her. Linda crashes the party, held at the estate of Arthur's father, and she and Arthur eventually spend time alone together, which is tracked by both families. Hobson is later hospitalized, and Arthur rushes to his side, vowing to care for the person who has long cared for him. After several weeks, Hobson dies, and then Arthur, who has been sober the entire time, goes on a drinking binge. On his wedding day, he visits the diner where Linda works and proposes to her. At the church, he jilts Susan, resulting in her abusive father, Burt Johnson, attempting to stab Arthur with a cheese knife, though he is prevented by Martha.

A wounded Arthur announces in the church that there will be no wedding then passes out soon after. Later, Linda attends to his wounds, and they discuss living a life of poverty. A horrified Martha tells Arthur that he can have his fortune, because no Bach has ever been working class. Arthur declines, but at the last minute, he talks privately to Martha. When he returns to Linda's side, he tells her that he declined again – Martha's dinner invitation, he means – but he did accept $750 million. Arthur's pleased chauffeur Bitterman drives the couple through Central Park.

Cast

Production 
Gordon originally wrote the title character with an American actor in mind. Prior to the casting of Moore, Al Pacino, Jack Nicholson, Richard Dreyfuss and James Caan were all considered for the role. In addition, Alec Guinness and David Niven were considered for the role of Hobson. According to Splitsider, John Belushi was also considered for Arthur. Initially Gordon wanted Moore to perform the role with an American accent, but this proved contentious as Moore had trouble doing so and eventually convinced Gordon to let him use his natural English accent. While some critiques objected to the obvious difference in accent between Arthur and his biological father, others were quick to catch the deeper implication that Hobson taught Arthur to speak. Debra Winger reportedly turned down the role of Linda. Goldie Hawn, Diane Keaton, Gilda Radner and Meryl Streep were also considered for the role of Linda.

Although the project was initially in the works at Paramount, studio executives eventually dropped the project and Orion Pictures stepped in. Promoting the film proved to be a challenge, reportedly six ad campaigns were discarded before a final one was decided upon.

Soundtrack 
Pop singer Christopher Cross was initially asked to score the film, but writer/director Steven Gordon did not feel comfortable with his lack of experience in composing for film and the job was given to Burt Bacharach. Cross was asked to compose a song for the film which he did, "Arthur's Theme", which he wrote with Bacharach along with Carole Bayer Sager and Peter Allen.

Reception 
The film received critical acclaim upon its release and is considered by many as one of the best films of 1981. It currently holds an 89% "Fresh" rating from 35 critics on the review aggregate website Rotten Tomatoes. The critical consensus reads: "Dudley Moore brings a boozy charm to Arthur, a coming of age tale for a wayward millionaire that deploys energetic cast chemistry and spiffy humor to jovial effect."

The film had a disappointing opening at the box office but improved its performance over its run, becoming the seventh highest-grossing film of the summer. It eventually earned over $95 million domestically, making it the fourth-highest-grossing film of 1981.

Then-U.S. President Ronald Reagan viewed this film at Camp David on July 25, 1981.

Awards and nominations

Honors 
The film is No. 10 on Bravo's "100 Funniest Movies," and No. 53 on the American Film Institute's 100 Years... 100 Laughs.

The film is recognized by American Film Institute in these lists:
 2000: AFI's 100 Years...100 Laughs – No. 53
 2002: AFI's 100 Years...100 Passions – Nominated
 2004: AFI's 100 Years...100 Songs:
 "Arthur's Theme (Best That You Can Do)" – No. 79
 2005: AFI's 100 Years...100 Movie Quotes:

Related films

Sequel 
The film was followed by a sequel in 1988, Arthur 2: On the Rocks. Lead players Dudley Moore, Liza Minnelli, and John Gielgud reprised their roles, as well as many supporting players such as Geraldine Fitzgerald, Barney Martin; but Ted Ross and Jill Eikenberry did not return. The sequel was a critical and financial failure.

Remake 
The 2011 version was first reported in 2008 with news that Arthur was to be remade by Warner Bros., with British actor/comedian Russell Brand in the lead role. Brand confirmed this during his March 10, 2009 appearance on The Howard Stern Show. The remake was an overall critical and financial failure.

Foreign versions 
The film had three Indian remakes. One was the 1984 Hindi-language film Sharaabi, the second was the 1985 Kannada-language film Nee Thanda Kanike, and the third was another 2004 Hindi Tumsa Nahin Dekha.

In popular culture 
The animated series The Critic starring Jon Lovitz shows a parody of Arthur called Arthur 3: Revenge of the Liver, where the character of Arthur Bach (voiced by Maurice LaMarche impersonating Dudley Moore) is shown intoxicated and is informed that he has cirrhosis of the liver.

In 2020, the film was honored at the On Cinema at the Cinema Seventh Annual Oscar Special. Film expert Gregg Turkington hosted a special sneak preview of the film's 40th anniversary celebration, which was planned for the 2021 Oscar Special.

References

External links 

 
 
 
 
 

1981 films
1980s romantic comedy-drama films
American romantic comedy-drama films
Best Musical or Comedy Picture Golden Globe winners
Films that won the Best Original Song Academy Award
1980s English-language films
Films about alcoholism
Films about inheritances
Films about interclass romance
Films about the upper class
Films featuring a Best Supporting Actor Academy Award-winning performance
Films featuring a Best Musical or Comedy Actor Golden Globe winning performance
Films featuring a Best Supporting Actor Golden Globe winning performance
Films scored by Burt Bacharach
Films shot in New York City
Films set in New York City
Orion Pictures films
Warner Bros. films
Arthur (film series)
1981 directorial debut films
1981 comedy films
1981 drama films
1980s American films